The 2011 Rice Owls football team represented Rice University in the 2011 NCAA Division I FBS football season. The Owls were led by fifth-year head coach David Bailiff and played their home games at Rice Stadium. They are a member of the West Division of Conference USA. They finished the season 4–8, 3–5 in C-USA play to finish in fourth place in the West Division.

Schedule

Roster

References

Rice
Rice Owls football seasons
Rice Owls football